Minuscule 560 (in the Gregory-Aland numbering), ε 1288 (in the Soden numbering), is a Greek minuscule manuscript of the New Testament, on parchment. Palaeographically it has been assigned to the 11th century. 
Scrivener labelled it by number 520.

Description 

The codex contains a complete text of the four Gospels on 367 parchment leaves (size ). The manuscript was written by many hands. The writing is in one column per page, 18-24 lines per page.

Text 

The Greek text of the codex is a representative of the Byzantine text-type. Aland placed it in Category V.
According to Claremont Profile Method it represents the textual family Kx in Luke 1, Luke 10, and Luke 20.

History 

The manuscript was written in Italy. It was in Caesar de Missy's collection in London in 1748 (along with the codex 561, ℓ 162, ℓ 239, ℓ 240).

The manuscripts was added to the list of the New Testament minuscule manuscripts by F. H. A. Scrivener (520) and C. R. Gregory (560).

Currently the manuscript is housed at the Glasgow University Library (Ms. Hunter 475) in Glasgow.

See also 

 List of New Testament minuscules
 Biblical manuscript
 Textual criticism
 Minuscule 562

References

Further reading 

 Gustavus Haenel, Catalogi librorum manuscriptorum qui in bibliothecis Galliae, Helvetiae, Belgii, Britaniae M., Hispaniae, Lusitaniae Asservantur, Lipsiae 1830.

External links 
 Minuscule 560 at the CSNTM

Greek New Testament minuscules
11th-century biblical manuscripts
University of Glasgow Library collection